Karambalangan is a type of personal armor from Java. It is a metal coating worn in front of the chest or breastplate.

History 
Karambalangan was recorded in the Kidung Panji Wijayakrama-Rangga Lawe (written as early as 1334 AD), which mentioned that Ranggalawe wore karambalangan manik (jeweled karambalangan) when he rebelled against Majapahit (1295 AD). Emperor Raden Wijaya in that kidung was recorded using golden karambalangan manik.

In the Kidung Sundayana, it is written that Gajah Mada before the Bubat tragedy wore a karambalangan (a metal plate on the front of the chest—breastplate) decorated with gold emboss, armed with a gold-plated spear, and a shield decorated with diamonds.

See also 

 Baju rantai
 Baju lamina
 Baju empurau
 Baru Oroba
 Baru lema'a
 Siping-siping
 Kawaca

References 

Indonesian inventions
Asian armour
Body armor
Military equipment of antiquity
Military equipment of Indonesia